Kris Thomas (born December 17, 1984) is an American singer. He competed in Season 4 of The Voice, earning a spot on Team Shakira and reaching the Top 10. His self-titled debut EP was released on December 17, 2013.

Early life 
Kris Thomas was born in Memphis, Tennessee. He began performing publicly at the age of 14 with his church choir.

He joined the Young Actors Guild, where he gained experience in stage performance and experimented in acting. The following year Thomas joined the Stax Music Academy, where he became a member and lead vocalist of StreetCorner Harmonie. Thomas later featured the Stax students in the music video "Two Kings", in which he joined Pam Tillis.

While obtaining his college degree from Middle Tennessee State University Thomas performed in various talent showcases. Thomas’ R&B cover of "I Know You Won't" by Carrie Underwood landed him a deal with Universal Republic Records.

Career

The Voice 

At the blind auditions on March 25, 2013, Thomas performed Whitney Houston's "Saving All My Love for You", prompting Shakira to turn her chair. At the Battle rounds, Thomas faced C. Perkins where they sang the song "It Will Rain". During the Knockouts, Thomas sang "What a Wonderful World" against Mary Miranda.

During the Live Playoffs, Thomas sang "When I Was Your Man" and  "I'll Be There". Thomas' final run was during Week Three of the playoffs, where he sang "Adorn".

2013: Kris Thomas EP 
On December 17, 2013 Kris Thomas released his first self-titled EP. The first single off of this EP is "Count Me In".

EP Track Listing
 Count Me In
 Long Goodbye
 Back Into Your Heart
 My Symphony
 Right To Be Gone

Concerts
Friends Forever Charity Concert Live In Kuala Lumpur

Discography

Releases from The Voice 
 When I Was Your Man
 I'll Be There
 Saving All My Love For You
 Adorn
 It Will Rain
 What a Wonderful World

Singles
 I Know You Won't
 Balloons
 Two Kings

External links
 

1984 births
African-American male singers
Living people
People from Memphis, Tennessee 
The Voice (franchise) contestants
21st-century American singers
21st-century American male singers